Amaterasu Patera is a patera, a complex crater with scalloped edges, on Jupiter's moon Io. It is one of the darkest features on Io, and the measurement of its thermal spectrum (its temperature was estimated in 1979 to be 281K) helped to support an anticorrelation between albedo and temperature for Ionian hotspots. The feature has darkened further since the first orbit around Jupiter by the Galileo spacecraft. It was named after the Japanese sun goddess Amaterasu. To the north are Kinich Ahau Patera and Dazhbog Patera, and to the west are Manua Patera and Fuchi Patera.

References

Surface features of Io (moon)